Art Style is a video game series created by skip Ltd. for WiiWare and DSiWare. The first game in the Art Style series, Orbient, was released for WiiWare in September 2008. Another two Art Style games, Cubello and Rotohex, were released during October 2008 while two more were added in 2010. Seven DSiWare Art Style games were released on that service after its launch in Japan in December 2008, with the first two being Aquario and Decode.

According to Nintendo, games in the Art Style series emphasize "elegant design, polished graphics, and pick-up-and-play controls" that create "an experience focused purely on fun and engaging game play." WiiWare titles released in the series cost 600 Nintendo Points, while DSiWare titles cost 500 points.

Art Style was preceded by a series of seven similar games for the Game Boy Advance called bit Generations. The bit Generations series came late in the life of the system and have not been released in Western territories, however some of those games have since been remade as Art Style games (with the exception of dotstream, which was given a sequel titled light trax).

Games

References

See also
Bit.Trip

2008 video games
Video game franchises
Skip Ltd. games
Nintendo franchises
WiiWare games
Wii-only games
DSiWare games
Nintendo DS-only games
Nintendo DS games
Video game franchises introduced in 2008
Video games developed in Japan